The MTV Europe Music Award are awarded in a series of categories, each of which isolate a specific contribution to the recording industry or geographical region. 

Firstly awarded in 1994, in its originating idea, was to promote European local artists, become since 2011 an occasion to honor artists not only from the EMEA region. 
In 1994 MTV acknowledged local European artists by introducing Local Hero award. Award was discontinued, but since 1998 there was a process of adding awards to regional musicians, starting with United Kingdom/Ireland, Italy, Germany, and Nordics. In 2000 MTV launched awards to French, Spanish, Polish, Dutch. Within the next couple of years, the number of regional award categories systematically increased by adding awards to the musicians from Russia, Romania, Portugal, Sweden, Finland, Denmark, Norway, Adria (former Yugoslavia: Serbia, Slovenia, Croatia, Montenegro, North Macedonia, Bosnia and Hercegovina), Baltics (Lithuania, Latvia, Estonia), Hungary, Ukraine, Turkey, Greece, Switzerland, Czech Republic and Slovakia. 

In 2005 award for best African act has been awarded, which was the first case when European in its name award was granted outside to the artists from geographical Europe. In 2007 awarded Arabic artists, and in 2008 awarded best Israeli act. 

Since 2007 viewers were able to select Best European Act from the winners of the regional categories, where Israeli act were included, but African and Arabic musicians were excluded from the category.

In 2011 MTV rebranded the award, and removed European from its name, shortening to MTV EMA only. It was the first year when Best Worldwide Act was granted. Award was given to the artists previously awarded in the regional categories for Best European Act, Best North American Act, Best Latin American Act, Best Africa, Middle East and India Act, Best Asian and Pacific Act.

There are only 3 categories that were awarded in every edition: Best Song, Best New Act, Best Rock.

Current main categories
 Best Video
 Best Song
 Best Artist
 Best New Act
 Best Group
 Best Pop
 Best Rock
 Best Hip-Hop
 Best Alternative
 Best Electronic
 Best Live Act
 Best Push Act
 Best World Stage Performance

Social media categories
 Biggest Fans
 Best Look

Special Awards
 Free Your Mind
 Global Icon
 Artist's Choice
 MTV Voice
 Ultimate Legend
 Video Visionary
 Power of Music
 Best Song with a Social Message
 Best Collaboration
 Generation Change

European regional categories
 Best Baltic Act
 Best Belgian Act
 Best Danish Act
 Best Dutch Act
 Best Finnish Act
 Best French Act
 Best German Act
 Best Greek Act
 Best Hungarian Act
 Best Israeli Act
 Best Italian Act
 Best Norwegian Act
 Best Polish Act
 Best Portuguese Act
 Best Romanian Act
 Best Spanish Act
 Best Swedish Act
 Best Swiss Act
 Best UK & Ireland Act
 Best Ukrainian Act

Non-European regional categories
 Best African Act
 Best Middle East Act
 Best Australian Act
 Best Brazilian Act
 Best Canadian Act
 Best Indian Act
 Best Japanese Act
 Best Korean Act
 Best Latin America North Act
 Best Latin America Central Act
 Best Latin America South Act
 Best Mainland China & Hong Kong Act
 Best New Zealander Act
 Best Southeast Asian Act
 Best Taiwanese Act
 Best US Act

Worldwide categories
 Best Africa, Middle East and India Act 
 Best Asian Act
 Best European Act
 Best Latin American Act
 Best North American Act
 Best Worldwide Act

Defunct categories 

 Best Cover (1994)
 MTV Amour (1996)
 MTV Select (1996–1998)
 Best Hard Rock (2002)
 Best Nordic Act (1999–2004)
 Best R&B (1997, 1999–2006)
 Web Award (2001–2003, 2007)
 Best Album (1998–2008)
 Best Urban (2007–2009)
 Best European Act (2008–2012)
 Best Turkish Act (2007–2009, 2011)
 Best Dutch & Belgian Act (2004–2010)
 Best Romanian & Moldovan Act (2007–2009)
 Best New UK & Ireland Act (2008–2010)
 Best Czech & Slovak Act (2010–2013)
 Best Hungarian Act (2007–2013)
 Best MTV2 UK Act (2003)
 Best Asia and Pacific Act (2011–2012)
 Best Male (1994–2006, 2009–2016)
 Best Female (1994–2006, 2009–2016)
 Best Adria Act (2005-2017)
 Best Russian Act (2004-2021)

Timeline

Main categories

Non-music awards

Honorary awards

Awards for contributions to activism

European regional categories

Local Hero Award
MTV Select

Non-European regional categories

See also
 List of Grammy Award categories

References

Music-related lists